The Institution of Electrical Engineers (IEE) was a British professional organisation of electronics, electrical, manufacturing, and Information Technology professionals, especially electrical engineers.  It began in 1871 as the Society of Telegraph Engineers.  In 2006, it changed its name to the Institution of Engineering and Technology (IET).

Notable past presidents have included Lord Kelvin (1889), Sir Joseph Swan (1898) and Sebastian de Ferranti (1910–11). Notable chairmen include John M. M. Munro (1910–11).

History 
The IEE was founded in 1871 as the Society of Telegraph Engineers, changed its name in 1880 to the Society of Telegraph Engineers and Electricians and changed to the Institution of Electrical Engineers in 1888. It was Incorporated by a Royal Charter in 1921.

In 1988 the Institution of Electrical Engineers (IEE) merged with the Institution of Electronic and Radio Engineers (IERE), originally the British Institution of Radio Engineers (Brit IRE) founded in 1925.

By the mid-2000s, the IEE was the largest professional engineering society in Europe, with a worldwide membership of around 120,000.

Discussions about a merger with the Institution of Incorporated Engineers (IIE) under a new name started in 2004, and following membership voting, the IEE merged with the IIE on 31 March 2006 to form the Institution of Engineering and Technology (IET).

Wiring Regulations

The IEE was the publisher of the British Standard for Electrical wiring in the United Kingdom, BS 7671.  This is now published by the IET.

See also
 Institute of Electrical and Electronics Engineers
 Institution of Engineering and Technology
 List of presidents of the Institution of Electrical Engineers
 Proceedings of the Institution of Electrical Engineers
 Charles Babbage Premium

References

External links
 Institution of Engineering and Technology
 Engineering Council UK
 IET Digital Library 
 IET Publishing

1871 establishments in the United Kingdom
Organizations established in 1871
Organizations disestablished in 2006
Defunct professional associations based in the United Kingdom
Electrical engineering organizations
Engineering societies based in the United Kingdom
Learned societies of the United Kingdom